Say It Loud – I'm Black and I'm Proud is the 23rd studio album by American musician James Brown. The album was released in March 1969, by King Records.

Track listing

Personnel
Clyde Stubblefield – drums 
'Sweet Charles' Sherell – bass 
Jimmy Nolen – guitar
Maceo Parker – sax
Fred Wesley - trombone
St. Clair Pinkney – sax
'Pee Wee Ellis' – sax
James Brown – Lead vocal

See also
R&B

References

1969 albums
James Brown albums
Albums produced by James Brown
King Records (United States) albums